is a Japanese judoka.

He was born in Ōmuta, Fukuoka, and began judo at the age of a first grader.

He won a gold medal at the -60 kg category of the Junior World Championships in 1992 and World Championships in 1993. After graduating from Meiji University, he entered the Tokyo Metropolitan Police Department.

Sonoda retired from competition in 2004.  By 2009, he coached All-Japan women's judo team before announcing his resignation on January 31, 2013, following accusations of physical abuse by team members.

He married judoka Noriko Anno in 2010.

References

External links
 

1973 births
Living people
Japanese male judoka
People from Ōmuta, Fukuoka
Asian Games medalists in judo
Judoka at the 1994 Asian Games
Judoka trainers
Asian Games silver medalists for Japan
Medalists at the 1994 Asian Games
20th-century Japanese people
21st-century Japanese people